Sassy is an album by the American jazz vocalist Sarah Vaughan with Hal Mooney and his orchestra, recorded in 1956 and released on the EmArcy label.

Track listing
 "Lush Life" (Billy Strayhorn) - 3:56   
 "I'm The Girl" (James Shelton) - 2:02   
 "Shake Down The Stars" (Eddie DeLange, Jimmy Van Heusen) - 2:43   
 "I've Got Some Crying To Do" (Al Frisch, Sid Wayne) - 2:46   
 "My Romance" (Lorenz Hart, Richard Rodgers) - 3:11   
 "I Loved Him" (Cole Porter) - 3:12   
 "Lonely Woman" (Benny Carter, Ray Sonin) - 2:59
 "Hey Naughty Papa" (Hoagy Carmichael) - 2:14
 "I'm Afraid The Masquerade Is Over" (Herb Magidson, Allie Wrubel) - 3:24   
 "The Boy Next Door" (Ralph Blane, Hugh Martin) - 2:47   
 "Old Folks" (Dedette Lee Hill, Willard Robison) - 3:10   
 "Only You Can Say" (Frisch, Wayne) - 2:56   
 "A Sinner Kissed an Angel" (Mack David, Richard M. Jones, Ray Joseph) - 3:35

Personnel 
Sarah Vaughan - vocals
Orchestra arranged and conducted by Hal Mooney

References 

1956 albums
Sarah Vaughan albums
EmArcy Records albums
Albums arranged by Hal Mooney